Scopula suffundaria is a moth of the  family Geometridae. It is found in Honduras.

References

Moths described in 1861
suffundaria
Moths of Central America